Most nation states have an anthem, defined as "a song, as of praise, devotion, or patriotism"; most anthems are either marches or hymns in style. A song or hymn can become a national anthem under the state's constitution, by a law enacted by its legislature, or simply by tradition. A royal anthem is a patriotic song similar to a national anthem, but it specifically praises or prays for a monarch or royal dynasty. Such anthems are usually performed at public appearances by the monarch or during other events of royal importance. Some states use their royal anthem as the national anthem, such as the state anthem of Jordan.

There are multiple claimants to the position of oldest national anthem. Among the national anthems, the first to be composed was the Dutch national anthem, the "Wilhelmus", which was written between 1568 and 1572. This has both Dutch and English language versions and is unusual in being an acrostic in both languages. The Japanese anthem, "Kimigayo", employs the oldest lyrics of any national anthem, taking its words from the "Kokin Wakashū", which was first published in 905, yet these words were not set to music until 1880. The first anthem to be officially adopted as such was the Spanish anthem "La Marcha Real", in 1770; its origins remain unclear; it is suggested that it has 16th century Venetian origins, or even that it was composed by king Frederick the Great himself; it is also one of the few national anthems that has never had official lyrics. Anthems became increasingly popular among European states in the 18th century. For example, the British national anthem "God Save the King" was first performed in 1745. The French anthem "La Marseillaise" was written half a century later in 1792, and adopted in 1795.

National anthems are usually written in the most common language of the state, whether de facto or official. States with multiple national languages may offer several versions of their anthem. For instance, Switzerland's national anthem has different lyrics for each of the country's four official languages: French, German, Italian, and Romansh. One of New Zealand's two national anthems is commonly sung with the first verse in Māori ("Aotearoa") and the second in English ("God Defend New Zealand"). The tune is the same but the lyrics have different meanings. South Africa's national anthem is unique in that it is two different songs put together with five of the country's eleven official languages being used, in which each language comprises a stanza.



UN member states and observer states

Anthems of partially recognized states and territories

See also
 List of former national anthems
 List of regional anthems
 Anthems of the autonomous communities of Spain
 List of U.S. state songs
 Anthems of the Soviet Republics
 Anthem of Europe
 Personal anthem
 Earth anthem
 Olympic Hymn

Notes

References
General

 
 

Specific

Further reading

External links
 List of national anthems on The World Factbook
 Various national anthems performed by the United States Navy Band

Lists of anthems
Anthems
Lists of patriotic songs